Jablonskia congesta is a species of flowering plant belonging to the  family Phyllanthaceae. The genus Jablonskia is monotypic.

This species is found in northern South America.

References

Phyllanthaceae
Phyllanthaceae genera
Monotypic Malpighiales genera
Flora of South America